Walter Keeley (1 April 1921 – 1995) was an English footballer who played as an outside left in the 1940s and 1950s.

Career
Keeley played for the Royal Air Force during the Second World War and guested for both Accrington Stanley and Manchester United, before joining Accrington Stanley permanently as a professional in 1946. Despite Keeley's healthy goal record, Accrington Stanley finished 20th in the 22-team Third Division North in 1946–47. He moved on to Bury of the Second Division in 1947–48, before he signed with Third Division South club Port Vale for 'a substantial fee', in exchange for Alf Bellis in January 1948. He made an excellent debut, scoring twice in a 3–0 win over Leyton Orient at The Old Recreation Ground on 10 January 1948. He played a further 15 games in 1947–48, but only scored the one goal (against Newport County), and so lost his place in August 1948, two games into the 1948–49 season. He was sold on to old club Accrington Stanley for £1,500 the next month. They finished one place and three points above the re-election zone in 1948–49, rose to 13th in 1949–50, and then finished 21st in 1950–51, and were forced to apply for re-election. He played for Stanley's league rivals Rochdale in 1951–52, who finished 21st, one place above Stanley. He later turned out for non-league side Fleetwood.

Career statistics
Source:

References

1921 births
1995 deaths
Footballers from Manchester
English footballers
Association football wingers
Royal Air Force personnel of World War II
Accrington Stanley F.C. (1891) players
Manchester United F.C. wartime guest players
Bury F.C. players
Port Vale F.C. players
Rochdale A.F.C. players
Fleetwood Town F.C. players
English Football League players